Edward F. Hilker (April 13, 1881 – March 4, 1949) was an American politician. He served six years in the Wisconsin State Senate and ten years in the Wisconsin State Assembly.

Biography
Hilker was born April 13, 1881, in Racine, Wisconsin, to Adolph and Carline Hilker.  His father was a pioneer brick manufacturer in Racine.  In 1898, at age 17, he volunteered for service in the Spanish–American War and was enlisted as a Private in Company M, 1st Wisconsin Volunteer Infantry Regiment. The war ended before his regiment saw any combat and he mustered out the same year.  He married Anne Deschler on November 11, 1899, and together they had one daughter, Grace.  Hilker worked in the candy wholesale business, as a coal broker, and in sales promotion.  He was a member of the United Spanish War Veterans, the Fraternal Order of Eagles, and the Knights of Pythias.

Political career
In 1916, Hilker was elected Alderman for the 8th ward on the Racine City Council.  He was re-elected six times, and served on the City Council until 1930.

In 1924, Hilker was elected to the Wisconsin Assembly for the Racine 2nd District.  He was re-elected in 1926, 1928, and 1930.  He ran for re-election again in 1932, but was defeated by former assemblyman, Democrat Joseph C. Hamata.

Hilker remained active in politics and was a delegate to the 1936 Republican National Convention.

In 1940, he reclaimed his former Assembly seat, defeating incumbent Wisconsin Progressive assemblyman Jack Harvey.

In 1942, he was elected to the Wisconsin Senate in the 21st District, representing all of Racine County.  He was a delegate, again, to the 1944 Republican National Convention.  He was re-elected to the senate in 1946, but died before the end of his second term.

Death
For years before his death, Hilker struggled with a diabetic condition.  In early 1949, he was hospitalized at the Wisconsin General Hospital in Madison, Wisconsin.  He deteriorated over several weeks until his death on March 4, 1949, with his wife and daughter were by his bedside.

His funeral was held at the Holy Communion Lutheran Church in Racine.  It was attended by many Wisconsin legislators, including pallbearers senators Bernhard Gettelman, Chester Dempsey, J. Earl Leverich, Taylor G. Brown, and Everett F. LaFond, and assemblyman Fred Pfennig.  He was laid to rest at Mound Cemetery in Racine, less than half a mile from his former home.

Electoral history

Wisconsin Assembly (1924-1932)

| colspan="6" style="text-align:center;background-color: #e9e9e9;"| Primary Election

| colspan="6" style="text-align:center;background-color: #e9e9e9;"| General Election

| colspan="6" style="text-align:center;background-color: #e9e9e9;"| Primary Election

| colspan="6" style="text-align:center;background-color: #e9e9e9;"| General Election

Wisconsin Assembly (1940)

| colspan="6" style="text-align:center;background-color: #e9e9e9;"| Primary Election

| colspan="6" style="text-align:center;background-color: #e9e9e9;"| General Election

Wisconsin Senate (1942-1946)

| colspan="6" style="text-align:center;background-color: #e9e9e9;"| Primary Election

| colspan="6" style="text-align:center;background-color: #e9e9e9;"| General Election

| colspan="6" style="text-align:center;background-color: #e9e9e9;"| Primary Election

| colspan="6" style="text-align:center;background-color: #e9e9e9;"| General Election

References

External links
The Political Graveyard

Wisconsin city council members
Republican Party members of the Wisconsin State Assembly
Republican Party Wisconsin state senators
Businesspeople from Racine, Wisconsin
Politicians from Racine, Wisconsin
Military personnel from Wisconsin
1881 births
1949 deaths
20th-century American politicians
20th-century American businesspeople
American military personnel of the Spanish–American War
United States Army soldiers